Andrew Leker is a game designer who has worked primarily on role-playing games.

Career
In the early 1980s, Andrew Leker was a physics and applied mathematics undergraduate at UC Berkeley, when he began imagining a roleplaying game set in a very alien realm; Jorune thus started as a variant of TSR's Metamorphosis Alpha. Leker self-published the first edition of SkyRealms of Jorune (1984) through a new company, SkyRealms Publishing. By the late 1980s, Leker was out of college and moving on to a career in the computer gaming field. Leker founded a new company called Mind Control Software in 1994. The company's first project was a Jorune-based computer game called Alien Logic (1994), which was published by SSI. Later he produced Silencer (1998) and the IGF awarded Oasis (2005).

References

External links
 

Living people
Place of birth missing (living people)
Role-playing game designers
Year of birth missing (living people)